Kachi Koli is an Indo-Aryan language spoken in Pakistan and India. Part of the Gujarati subfamily, Kachi Koli is closely related to Parkari Koli and Wadiyara Koli.

References

Languages of India
Koli people
Indo-Aryan languages
Languages of Gujarat